Victoria Luine is an American psychologist and neurochemist, currently a Distinguished Professor at Hunter College, City University of New York, and also a published author.

References

Year of birth missing (living people)
Living people
City University of New York faculty
21st-century American psychologists
American neuroscientists
American women neuroscientists
University at Buffalo alumni
Rockefeller University faculty